Terence Murphy (born 14 January 1940) is an English former professional footballer who played in the Football League as a left half for Crewe Alexandra. He played non-league football for Northwich Victoria and Witton Albion, managed clubs including Rhyl, Runcorn, Altrincham and Witton Albion, and acted as scout for the latter club.

References
General
 . Retrieved 21 October 2013.
Specific

1940 births
Living people
Footballers from Liverpool
English footballers
Association football wing halves
Northwich Victoria F.C. players
Crewe Alexandra F.C. players
Witton Albion F.C. players
English Football League players
English football managers
Rhyl F.C. managers
Runcorn F.C. Halton managers
Altrincham F.C. managers
Witton Albion F.C. managers